Arlequin is a free population genetics software distributed as an integrated GUI data analysis software. It performs several types of tests and calculations, including Fixation index (Fst, also known as the "F-statistics"), computing genetic distance, Hardy–Weinberg equilibrium, linkage disequilibrium, analysis of molecular variance, mismatch distribution, and pairwise difference tests.

The newest version is 3.5.2.2 and is available only on Microsoft Windows as zip archive and installation executables. 
Mac OS X and Linux have only older 3.5.2 version but restricted on 64-bit environments and have only command-line interface as the "arlecore" program, "arlsumstat" program, as well as the example files.

References

External links
 Official site
 About

Free bioinformatics software
Science software for Linux
Science software for macOS
Science software for Windows